The Goffertpark is a public park in Nijmegen, The Netherlands. The park, which is sometimes used as an outdoor concert venue, also holds the stadium of football club N.E.C.

History
In the early 1930s, the city of Nijmegen began development on sixty areas of woodland and heathland, with plans for a sports field, a stadium, a teahouse, and a zoo. On Saturday, July 8th, 1939, the new Goffertpark was opened to the public.

The plans for the Goffertpark were part of the General Expansion of Nijmegen, prepared by planning early thirties A. Siebers. This expansion included a network of ring roads and radials, following the canals around the old town. Districts should be provided with green strips, parks and playgrounds. And in the southwest of the city would be around the old farm Goffert The Volkspark come for a great recreational and sporting activities. Elsewhere in the Netherlands when these parks were built, such as the Hague and Amsterdam Forest Zuiderpark. On the insistence of Mayor J. A.H. Steinweg took the Empire in the context of the construction costs of unemployment relief Goffertpark itself. From the spring of 1935 there were over 160 unemployed people to work for a fee of 35 cents per hour. Although the construction of the park was used the natural slope of land, were still 600,000 cubic metres of sand are moved. For as many people into work, but this did not happen with excavators with shovels and wheelbarrows. By far the hardest job was digging the six metres deep pit for the stadium, which it nicknamed "the bloedkuul" remained.

Since it's development, Goffertpark has served as a venue for public gatherings and a wide range of events.

Present status
The park is inscribed as a municipal monument.

The stadium, with athletics and cycling, became the home of football in 1939, when N.E.C. moved there. Over the years, there have been various events and performances in the stadium. In 1999, sixty years after the opening, park and stadium were thoroughly refurbished and modernized.

Artists, including AC/DC, Aerosmith, Iron Maiden, Black Sabbath, Bon Jovi (2×), Bruce Springsteen and the E Street Band, Coldplay (2×), Deftones, Guns N' Roses (3×), Kings of Leon (2×), KISS, Korn, Limp Bizkit, Linkin Park, Eminem, Metallica, Mudvayne, Mumford and Sons, Phil Collins, Muse (2×), Pearl Jam (2×), Pink Floyd, Rammstein (2x), Robbie Williams, R.E.M., Radiohead, Red Hot Chili Peppers (3×), The Rolling Stones (2×), U2, Van Halen, and Velvet Revolver have performed at the Goffertpark as a concert venue.

See also
 Stadion de Goffert

External links

www.nijmegen.nl - Nijmegen city official website.

Parks in Gelderland
Nijmegen
Geography of Gelderland
Tourist attractions in Gelderland
Protected areas established in 1939
1939 establishments in the Netherlands